Jarred Michael Tinordi (born February 20, 1992) is an American professional ice hockey defenseman for the  Chicago Blackhawks of the National Hockey League (NHL). He was drafted by the Montreal Canadiens 22nd overall in the 2010 NHL Entry Draft. He was also drafted in the seventh round (184th overall) by Metallurg Magnitogorsk during the 2010 KHL Junior Draft.

Early life
Tinordi was born in Burnsville, Minnesota, while his father, Mark, was a member of the Minnesota North Stars, and briefly lived in Plano, Texas, when the franchise became known as the Dallas Stars. The family eventually settled in the Washington, D.C., suburb of Millersville, Maryland, when Mark was traded to the Washington Capitals. In his youth he played in the 2004 Quebec International Pee-Wee Hockey Tournament with the Washington Little Capitals minor ice hockey team. He attended Severna Park Middle School and played for the school for the 2006-2007 season only. He later served as captain of the USA Hockey National Team Development Program, and attended Ann Arbor Pioneer High School.

Playing career
Tinordi committed to University of Notre Dame Fighting Irish of the Central Collegiate Hockey Association (CCHA) for the 2010–11 season. On August 10, 2010, it was announced that Tinordi would play for the London Knights of the OHL for the 2010–11 season, forgoing his NCAA eligibility.

On March 16, 2013, as a member of the Montreal Canadiens, he played his first NHL game against the New Jersey Devils, scoring his first NHL career point on an assist in the third period. The Canadiens would go on to win the game 2-1.

In the 2015–16 season, Tinordi, no longer waiver-exempt, made the Canadiens roster out of camp as a defenseman. With the Canadiens producing the league's best start to the season, Tinordi did not play in a game in the opening months. On November 26, 2015, he was assigned to new AHL affiliate the St. John's IceCaps on a conditioning stint, appearing in 6 games. In his return to the Canadiens, Tinordi played in only three games in two months. On January 15, 2016, he was traded to the Arizona Coyotes in exchange for Victor Bartley and John Scott.

On March 9, 2016, the NHL announced that they had suspended Tinordi for 20 games without pay for violating the terms of the NHL/NHLPA Performance Enhancing Substances Program. In a statement released by the NHLPA, Tinordi stated: "I did not knowingly take a banned substance. I understand, however, that I am responsible for what enters my body as a professional athlete and I accept the suspension. I will work hard towards my return to the ice and will learn from this frustrating setback." The Arizona Coyotes subsequently announced their full support of both the Performance Enhancing Substances Program and Tinordi.

In the following 2016–17 season, upon serving his suspension, Tinordi was placed on waivers by the Arizona Coyotes and sent to the team's AHL affiliate Tucson Roadrunners. He scored the first Roadrunners goal in their home debut on October 28. He played out the season, appearing in 64 games and registering 11 points.

On July 1, 2017, Tinordi signed a one-year, two-way contract with the reigning Stanley Cup champions Pittsburgh Penguins. Tinordi was assigned by Pittsburgh to the Wilkes-Barre/Scranton Penguins for the duration of the 2017–18 season. As a key presence on the blueline, Tinordi established new professional highs with 5 goals and 21 points in 62 games.

Tinordi left the Penguins in the off-season as a free agent to sign a one-year, two-way contract with the Nashville Predators on July 1, 2018. Prior to the start of the 2018-19 season, Tinordi was named captain of the Predators' American League affiliate, the Milwaukee Admirals. He spent the season with the Admirals, recording eight goals and 22 points in 75 games.

On May 29, 2019, the Predators re-signed Tinordi to a two-year, two-way contract extension. During the 2019–20 season with the Predators, on January 29, 2020, Tinordi recorded his first career NHL goal against the Washington Capitals.

During the 2020–21 season, after appearing in seven games with the Predators, Tinordi was claimed off waivers by the Boston Bruins on February 27, 2021. He played out the remainder of his contract with the Bruins, registering one assist through 14 regular season games. On March 16, 2021, Tinordi was involved in a collision with Penguins forward Brandon Tanev. Tanev was given a 5 minute major penalty and a game misconduct for Boarding. Tinordi did not return to the game. In the postseason, he made four appearances with the Bruins.

As a free agent from the Bruins, Tinordi joined his sixth NHL organization in agreeing to a two-year, $1.8 million contract with the New York Rangers on July 28, 2021. 

Entering the final year of his contract, Tinordi was placed on waivers prior to the commencement of the  season. On October 11, 2022, he was claimed by the Chicago Blackhawks, marking his seventh NHL organization. Securing a regular third-pairing role on the blueline, on November 12, 2022, Tinordi recorded his first multi-goal game, matching his career goal totals to date, in scoring the game-winner against the Anaheim Ducks in a 3-2 victory.

International play

He was selected to take part in the 2012 World Junior Ice Hockey Championships for the United States men's national junior ice hockey team.

Personal life
Tinordi is the son of former NHL player Mark Tinordi, who played for the New York Rangers, Minnesota North Stars/Dallas Stars, and Washington Capitals. Mark Tinordi was the final captain of the Minnesota North Stars, and the first captain of the Dallas Stars.

Career statistics

Regular season and playoffs

International

Awards and honors

References

External links

 

1992 births
Living people
American men's ice hockey defensemen
American people of Canadian descent
Arizona Coyotes players
Boston Bruins players
Chicago Blackhawks players
Doping cases in ice hockey
Hamilton Bulldogs (AHL) players
Hartford Wolf Pack players
Ice hockey people from Maryland
Ice hockey players from Minnesota
London Knights players
Metallurg Magnitogorsk draft picks
Milwaukee Admirals players
Montreal Canadiens draft picks
Montreal Canadiens players
Nashville Predators players
National Hockey League first-round draft picks
New York Rangers players
People from Burnsville, Minnesota
People from Severna Park, Maryland
St. John's IceCaps players
Tucson Roadrunners players
USA Hockey National Team Development Program players
Wilkes-Barre/Scranton Penguins players